is a 3D fighting game developed by Arika and published by Namco. It was released exclusively in Japan in December 1998 and has never been released overseas or ported to any home consoles. A spiritual sequel, Fighting EX Layer, was released in 2018.

Gameplay
The gameplay system is similar to that of the Street Fighter EX series (also developed by Arika), such as canceling supers into other supers, and universal guard-break attacks. Unlike in the Street Fighter EX series, fighters can now dash forward or backward by tapping the directions twice and fighters can now also side step with a specific button combination. This game also introduces two new mechanics. One where players can perform safe falls to keep from hitting the ground and the other making their fighter dodge and charge up their super gauge to its maximum.

Characters
Two of the game's characters, Allen Snider and Blair Dame, previously appeared in the arcade games Street Fighter EX, Street Fighter EX Plus, and the PlayStation version of Street Fighter EX Plus, titled Street Fighter EX Plus α.

Allen Snider 
Blair Dame 
Capriccio 
Exodus 
George Jensent 
Hong Gillson
Janis Luciani
Jig Jid Bartol 
Lan Yinghua  
Sessyu Tsukikage
Shang Fenghuang 
Tetsuo Kato

Secret characters (can be unlocked through time release):
Clemence Keliber
Joe Fendi 
Preston Ajax

Boss characters (cannot be unlocked):
Knight
Falcon
Tiger
Shark
Vold Ignitio (final boss)
Shin Knight (hidden boss)

Reception 
In Japan, Game Machine listed Fighting Layer on their February 1, 1999 issue as being the eleventh most-successful arcade game of the month.

References

External links
Official website 
Official website 

1998 video games
Arcade video games
Arcade-only video games
Arika games
Japan-exclusive video games
Namco games
Fighting games
Video games developed in Japan
Video games scored by Shinji Hosoe